Alice in Wonderland is a 1966 BBC television play, shot on film, based on Lewis Carroll's 1865 book Alice's Adventures in Wonderland. It was adapted, produced and directed by Jonathan Miller, then best known for his appearance in the satirical revue Beyond the Fringe.

Miller's production is unique among live-action Alice films in that he consciously avoided the standard Tenniel-inspired costume design and "florid" production values. Most of the Wonderland characters are played by actors in standard Victorian dress, with a real cat used to represent the Cheshire Cat. Miller justified his approach as an attempt to return to what he perceived as the essence of the story: "Once you take the animal heads off, you begin to see what it's all about. A small child, surrounded by hurrying, worried people, thinking 'Is that what being grown up is like?'"

Cast
 John Gielgud as the Mock Turtle
 Peter Cook as the Mad Hatter
 Leo McKern as the Ugly Duchess
 Peter Sellers as the King of Hearts
 Michael Redgrave as the Caterpillar
 Anne-Marie Mallik as Alice
 Alan Bennett as the Mouse
 Wilfrid Brambell as the White Rabbit
 Michael Gough as the March Hare
 Wilfrid Lawson as the Dormouse
 Alison Leggatt as the Queen of Hearts
 Malcolm Muggeridge as the Gryphon
 John Bird as the Fish Footman
 David Battley as the Executioner
 Eric Idle (uncredited) as a member of the Caucus Race

Production
Interiors were filmed at Netley Hospital, a mid-19th-century building that was demolished not long after the film was made. Beach scenes with the Gryphon and the Mock Turtle were filmed at Pett Level in East Sussex. The courtroom scene was recorded at the BBC's Ealing Studios and involved the building of the largest set that Stage 2 at Ealing had ever seen.

References

External links
 
 Alice in Wonderland (BFI)
DVD Review of 1966 BBC adaptation at DVDTalk.com
"Jonathan Miller and Childhood", DVD review from Lewis Carroll Review

1966 television films
1966 films
1960s fantasy films
BBC television dramas
Films based on Alice in Wonderland
1966 television plays
Films scored by Ravi Shankar
Television articles with incorrect naming style
1960s English-language films
Films directed by Jonathan Miller